R. J. Cole (born August 24, 1999)  is an American professional basketball player for Lavrio of the Greek Basket League. He played college basketball for the Howard Bison and the UConn Huskies.

Early life and high school career
Cole attended basketball powerhouse St. Anthony High School. He was ranked a three-star prospect and maintained a 4.0 grade point average. Cole turned down offers from Boston University and Monmouth to play at Howard, where he believed he could make an immediate impact.

College career
As a freshman at Howard, Cole averaged 23.7 points per game and 6.2 assists per game, leading the Mid-Eastern Athletic Conference in both categories. He scored 42 against UNC Wilmington on December 22, 2017; one of his five games in excess of 30 points. Cole was named to the First Team All-MEAC and MEAC Rookie of the Year.

As a sophomore, Cole was named MEAC Player of the Week on five occasions. He had a season-high 36 points in the regular-season finale versus Norfolk State. Cole led the MEAC in scoring with 21.4 points per game. He was named the MEAC Player of the Year and was an Associated Press Honorable Mention All-American. Cole led Howard to the College Basketball Invitational, where the team fell to Coastal Carolina despite 14 points, 12 rebounds, 8 assists and 3 steals from Cole. After the season, Cole declared for the 2019 NBA draft but did not hire an agent, which left him with the option to withdraw from the draft and return to school for his junior year.

After withdrawing from the draft, Cole transferred to the University of Connecticut (UConn). He chose UConn over Alabama and Seton Hall. As a junior, Cole averaged 12.2 points, 4.3 assists, and three rebounds per game in a complementary role to James Bouknight.

On December 21, 2021, Cole reached 2,000 career points in a win against Marquette. He was named to the First Team All-Big East.

Professional career
On July 22, 2022, Cole signed his first professional contract with Greek club Lavrio.

Career statistics

College

|-
| style="text-align:left;"| 2017–18
| style="text-align:left;"| Howard
| 33 || 32 || 37.9 || .394 || .359 || .770 || 3.9 || 6.1 || 1.7 || .0 || 23.7
|-
| style="text-align:left;"| 2018–19
| style="text-align:left;"| Howard
| 34 || 33 || 35.6 || .415 || .387 || .819 || 4.1 || 6.4 || 1.9 || .0 || 21.4
|-
| style="text-align:left;"| 2019–20
| style="text-align:left;"| UConn
| style="text-align:center;" colspan="11"|  Redshirt
|-
| style="text-align:left;"| 2020–21
| style="text-align:left;"| UConn
| 23 || 21 || 31.1 || .387 || .386 || .770 || 3.0 || 4.3 || 1.2 || .0 || 12.2
|-
| style="text-align:left;"| 2021–22
| style="text-align:left;"| UConn
| 33 || 33 || 33.5 || .415 || .339 || .858 || 3.4 || 4.1 || 1.1 || .1 || 15.8
|- class="sortbottom"
| style="text-align:center;" colspan="2"| Career
| 123 || 119 || 34.8 || .404 || .366 || .804 || 3.7 || 5.3 || 1.5 || .0 || 18.8

References

External links
UConn Huskies bio
Howard Bison bio

1999 births
Living people
American men's basketball players
American expatriate basketball people in Greece
Basketball players from Jersey City, New Jersey
Howard Bison men's basketball players
Lavrio B.C. players
Point guards
Shooting guards
UConn Huskies men's basketball players